James Bernard Gaynor (22 May 1875 – 20 November 1918) was an Australian rules footballer who played with Carlton in the Victorian Football League (VFL).

Notes

External links 

Jimmy Gaynor's profile at Blueseum

1875 births
Australian rules footballers from Victoria (Australia)
Carlton Football Club players
1918 deaths